The Basilicata regional election of 1980 took place on 8 June 1980.

Events
Christian Democracy was by far the largest party, largely ahead of the Italian Communist Party, which came distantly second. After the election Vincenzo Verrastro, the incumbent Christian Democratic President, was re-elected President for the third time in a row. In 1982 Verrastro was replaced by fellow Christian Democrat Carmelo Azzarà.

Results

Source: Ministry of the Interior

Elections in Basilicata
1980 elections in Italy